GCAC may stand for:
 Gulf Coast Athletic Conference, an intercollegiate athletic conference in the Division I ranks of the NAIA
 Gateway Collegiate Athletic Conference, a former women's athletic conference with one men's sport (football) in the Division I ranks of the NCAA
 Girls Catholic Athletic Conference, an American high school athletic conference, counterpart of the Chicago Catholic League